The Lycee Français de Chicago is a private, French international school located in Lincoln Square, Chicago, Illinois. It offers a dual French and English curriculum. The Lycée is founded on the French National Curriculum as defined by the French Ministry of Education and complemented by an English language  program in addition to foreign  language courses.

History
The private school was founded in 1995 by a group of French and American parents, with backing from French businesses and the support of the Consul General of France in Chicago.  The Lycée is accredited by the French Ministry of Education and is listed on the official directory of the French Schools in Foreign Countries as part of the AEFE French worldwide network which includes over 450 schools outside France. The school is also registered with the Illinois State Board of Education and accredited by the Independent School Association of Central States (ISACS). The Lycée Français de Chicago opened with 134 students. Today the school has over 850 American and foreign national students representing more than 30 nationalities, including French, American, Italian, Dutch, Austrian, German, Norwegian, Swedish, Greek, Czech, Polish, Ukrainian, Hungarian, Russian, Turkish, Pakistani, Canadian, English, Scottish, Irish, Croatian, Serbian, South African, Haitian, Chinese and many more.

Funding and Direction
The Lycée is funded in part by the AEFE, l'Agence pour l'Enseignement Français à l'Étranger, but remains an entirely private school with no connection to the French Government. The school is run by the Board of Trustees, composed of parents and alumni, but day-to-day operations are overseen by Éric Veteau, the head of the school, Sévrine Fougerol, the head of Secondary, and Pascal Léon, the head of Primary.

Campus

Curriculum
The school has a structural curriculum mandated by the French Ministry of Education and an English curriculum developed using guidelines from the National Council of Teachers of English and the State of Illinois.

The program conforms to the French system. It is broken down into subdivisions that roughly correspond to those in the American school system: pre-kindergarten, junior kindergarten and kindergarten, elementary school (1st through 5th grades), middle school (6 through 9th grades), and high school (10th through 12th grades).

The program from pre-K through 5th grade is divided into cycles: cycle 1 (pre-kindergarten, junior kindergarten and kindergarten), cycle 2 (1st and 2nd grade) and cycle 3 (3rd through 5th grade).

Middle school (collège) comprises grade 6 through 9. Instruction is structured according to subjects: French, English, mathematics, history, geography, civics, biology, technology, art, music and physical education. Beginning in grade 7 students also study physics and Latin.

Starting in fourth grade, students learn a third language, either Mandarin, Spanish, or German. As part of the language curriculum, each language class does a cultural exchange for two weeks with another French school in the country they are studying. In high school, they are also given the opportunity to do a three-month study abroad trip.

Middle school also offers the OIB curriculum which is the International Baccalaureate Option, which focuses in addition to French history and literature on American and world history and literature.

Grades 10, 11 and 12 define high school in the French system and those 3 years are known as lycée. During the lycée years students choose a track with emphasis on different courses: track L (literature), ES (economics and social sciences) or S (sciences), which, as the French Department of Education reforms its curriculum, is set to change in 2021.

The lycée years, as well as the curriculum as a whole, prepare the students for the French general Baccalaureate examination and the international option of the French Baccalaureate. With the Baccalaureate degree, students of the Lycée Français de Chicago can enter selective American or European schools, colleges, or universities.

The Lycee also offers the International Baccalaureate Middle Years Programme and Diploma Programme for English-speaking high school students. Th

See also
 Agence pour l'enseignement français à l'étranger
 Education in France
 International Baccalaureate
 European Baccalaureate
American schools in France:
 American School of Paris - An American international school in France
 American School of Grenoble

References

External links
Lycée Français de Chicago

AEFE accredited schools
Bilingual schools in the United States
Educational institutions established in 1995
French-American culture in Illinois
Private elementary schools in Chicago
Private middle schools in Chicago
French international schools in the United States
International schools in Illinois
Private high schools in Chicago
Preparatory schools in Illinois
1995 establishments in Illinois